Spodnje Vetrno (in older sources also Spodnje Veterne) is a settlement in the Municipality of Tržič in the Upper Carniola region of Slovenia.

References

External links
Spodnje Vetrno at Geopedia

Populated places in the Municipality of Tržič